Mink Brar (born 4 November) is a German model, actress and producer. Mink is known for her work in Bollywood films and on Indian television shows. She participated in the reality show Bigg Boss in 2012.

Early life
Mink was born on 4 November in Frankfurt, Germany to Punjabi parents who migrated from India to Germany. About her name, Mink says, "It's a very unique name. Mink is an animal that loves water and freedom, and is known for its precious fur." She was raised in Germany. Mink wanted to be a magistrate as a child. She got her education from Germany and completed a bachelor's degree.

Career
Veteran actor Dev Anand introduced Mink to the Indian film industry when she was 13. She made her debut in the Indian film industry with Dev Anand's Hindi film Pyaar Ka Tarana, which was released in September 1993. She then appeared in several films like Jung (1996), Saat Rang Ke Sapne (1998), Yamraaj (1998), Hum Aapke Dil Mein Rehte Hain (1999), Ganga Ki Kasam (1999), Maa Kasam (1999), Jwalamukhi (2000), Ajnabee (2001), Zahreela (2001), Pitaah (2002), Chalo Ishq Ladaaye (2002), Raaz(2002),Border Hindustan Ka (2003), and Oops (2003). She also worked in some South Indian films, including a Telugu movie, Prematho Raa (2001)

Bro and Sis Productions
In 2006, Mink turned into a producer and started a production house called Bro and Sis Productions with her brother Punnu Brar. She said in an interview, "Be it films, serials or even event management, we are ready. Bro and Sis Productions will be a complete entertainment house." Their first major work was the movie Katputtli, which was released in August 2006, in which Mink played the lead role. The film, however, failed to do any good business. The production company is presently producing an untitled project.

Music videos
In February 1999, Mink made a special dance appearance for the song Jumbalakka in the Tamil film En Swasa Kaatre. Mink appeared in the music video Lal Garara, from the movie and album Badal, which was released in February 2000. In August 2008, her production company released a music album, Ghonghat Mix, in which she acted in the music video, Mujhko Ranaji Maaf Karna. This music album was Bro and Sis Productions second major work after the movie Katputtli. Mink said in an interview, "We were so exhausted after making Katputtli that we wanted to make something more enjoyable and easy to do."

Reality television
She participated in a dance reality TV show Dancing Queen for the TV channel Colors. The show went on air in December 2008. In March 2009, she appeared in Sarkaar Ki Duniya, an adventure reality show on Real, from where she was eliminated in the 17th week in June 2009.

In February 2011, she appeared in sports entertainment reality game TV show, Zor Ka Jhatka - Total Wipeout, on Imagine TV which was hosted by Shahrukh Khan. The show was based on the American reality show Wipeout. She told IANS, "I lost six kilos while I was shooting for Zor Ka Jhatka. I got hurt, but I tried my level best to be in the competition". She next participated in a celebrity reality TV show Bigg Boss Season 6, entering the show in October 2012 as a wild card contestant. She said in an interview with PTI, "I am not here for getting a new platform because Bigg Boss is a show which can make somebody popular or destroy their image. I would not like to come out as an aggressive or a crazy person." She was voted out from the Bigg Boss house in December 2012. Talking about her experience in the show, after her exit, she said in an interview with The Times of India, "It was a life time experience, it's a mixture of all good and bad and everything that even don't exits I would say."

Controversies
In July 2011, a few media reports suggested that Mink has acted in a porn film titled Desert Queen. The posters of the film, featuring Mink, were put up at various locations in Los Angeles. Mink denied having acted in any such project. She said in an interview with The Times of India, "I was shocked. I cried a lot. Though the poster has my photo, I am not in the film. I just want to ask all those who have done this, do they have a proof that it's me?"
In August 2011, a video surfaced where Mink was seen kissing a South African woman in a swimming pool. The video went viral in India. Reacting to the video, Mink admitted that she is a lesbian, however, she later withdrew her statement saying she was hungover when she said that and remarked, "I am not a lesbian. I was so drunk in the party that I could have smooched anybody in front of me. It was like a moment that just came and I acted on it."
Media reports indicated in January 2013, while distributing blankets to homeless people with her brother in Versova, Mumbai, Mink spotted a veteran photographer Jagdish Mali, who is also the father of Indian actress, Antara Mali, in a semi-nude dishevelled & disoriented state. Mink said, "I looked out of the window and immediately recognized him. I stopped the car and walked up to him with my brother who got him a pair of shorts & a T-shirt." About his condition, Mink elaborated, "He was covered with faeces and looked as though he had not eaten in a while. He seemed very disturbed and completely disconnected." It was reported that Mink made sure he reached home safely and contacted Salman Khan for assistance. However, Jagdish's family and friends said that his condition was absolutely fine, though he was diabetic, and Mink was manipulating this issue to the press to get publicity, and that they could take legal action against Mink for spreading wrong information.

Personal life
Mink was raised in a conservative and protective environment, with her family trying to inculcate in her traditional Indian values instead of western ones. Her immediate family consists of her mother and brother named Punnu Brar, who is three years older to her.

Filmography

Television

See also

List of Indian film actresses

References

External links
 

Year of birth missing (living people)
Living people
Actors from Frankfurt
German people of Punjabi descent
German people of Indian descent
German female models
German film actresses
German television actresses
German women film producers
German television producers
Punjabi people
Bigg Boss (Hindi TV series) contestants
Women television producers
German expatriates in India
Actresses of Indian descent
European actresses in India
Actresses in Hindi cinema
Actresses in Malayalam cinema
Actresses in Tamil cinema
Actresses in Telugu cinema
Actresses in Hindi television
21st-century German actresses